Christine Cecilia McIntyre (April 16, 1911 – July 8, 1984) was an American actress and singer who appeared in various films in the 1930s and 1940s. She is mainly remembered as the beautiful blonde actress who appeared in many of The Three Stooges shorts produced by Columbia Pictures.

Early career
A native of Nogales, Arizona, Christine McIntyre was one of five children. A classically trained singer, McIntyre received a Bachelor of Music degree at Chicago Musical College in 1933. It was here that she developed her operatic soprano voice, which would be put to good use in several Three Stooges films in the 1940s. McIntyre began singing in feature films at RKO Pictures, and made her film debut in 1937's Swing Fever. She then appeared in a series of B-westerns featuring the likes of Ray Corrigan and Buck Jones. She appeared with dark hair in these early roles, and also appeared occasionally in "mainstream" feature films (like 1939's Blondie Takes a Vacation). She sang songs such as "The Blue Danube" and "Voices of Spring" in a Vienna-themed short Soundies musical film, and her performance was singled out as the best of the inaugural series. Her singing in this soundie may have given the Three Stooges the idea of using "Voices of Spring" in their short film Micro-Phonies.

The Three Stooges and Columbia Pictures
In 1944, Columbia Pictures producer Hugh McCollum signed McIntyre to a decade-long contract. At Columbia, she appeared in many short subjects starring Shemp Howard, Harry Langdon, Andy Clyde, Joe Besser, Bert Wheeler, and Hugh Herbert. The Herbert comedy Wife Decoy is actually a showcase for McIntyre, who is the principal character. In this film, she appears as a brunette who dyes her hair blonde. From then on in her screen appearances, she remained a blonde. In all of her Columbia comedies she played charming heroines, scheming villains, and flighty socialites.

Her debut appearance with the Three Stooges was in Idle Roomers, followed by a solo Shemp Howard short, Open Season for Saps. McIntyre's singing voice was featured prominently in 1945's Micro-Phonies, as she sang both "Voices of Spring" and "Lucia Sextet" and was also featured in 1947’s Out West. She again sang "Lucia Sextet" in 1948’s Squareheads of the Round Table and its 1954 remake, Knutzy Knights.

Her performance as Miss Hopkins in Brideless Groom featured an acclaimed knockabout scene in which she repels suitor Shemp Howard - right through a door. Director Edward Bernds remembers:

McCollum and Bernds recognized McIntyre's abilities and often tailored material especially for her, allowing her to improvise as she saw fit.

McIntyre also won a feature-film contract with Monogram Pictures. After playing a newspaper publisher in News Hounds, a comedy with The Bowery Boys, she usually played opposite Monogram's cowboy stars in low-budget Westerns.

McIntyre married radio personality John Donald Wilson in 1953. By this time, McCollum and Bernds had left Columbia, leaving Jules White in charge of short subjects. White favored strenuous, extremely physical humor, and forced the ladylike McIntyre to submit to low comedy; in a single film, her character was tackled, hit with messy projectiles, covered with cake batter, and knocked into a cross-eyed stupor. When her contract at Columbia expired in 1954, she was all too happy to retire from show business, eventually developing a career in real estate. Columbia continued to use old footage of McIntyre through 1957, which is why she received billing in films made after her retirement.

Death

Wilson's sudden death from a heart attack on January 26, 1984, at age 73 took its toll on McIntyre. She was already suffering from cancer at the time of his passing, and his death worsened her illness. McIntyre died in Van Nuys, California on July 8, 1984, at age 73, almost six months after her husband. The two are interred in the same plot at the Holy Cross Cemetery in Culver City, California. They had no children.

Filmography

with The Three Stooges, Andy Clyde, El Brendel, Joe DeRita, Joe Besser and Shemp Howard

 His Tale is Told (1944, Short) – Mrs. A.S. Steele
 Defective Detectives (1944, Short) – Mrs. Rodney Boodle
 Idle Roomers (1944, Short) – Mrs. Leander
 Open Season for Saps (1944, Short) – Irene
 No Dough Boys (1944, Short) – Celia Zweiback
 Three Pests in a Mess (1945, Short) – Cheatham's Secretary
 Off Again, On Again (1945, Short) – Edith
 Pistol Packin' Nitwits (1945, Short) – Queenie Lynch
 Where the Pest Begins (1945, Short) – Annie Batts
 Micro-Phonies (1945, Short) – Alice Andrews – aka Alice Van Doren
 The Blonde Stayed On (1946, Short) – Maisie
 Jiggers, My Wife! (1946, Short) – Trixie
 The Three Troubledoers (1946, Short) – Nell the Blacksmith
 Society Mugs (1946, Short) – Muriel Allen
 Slappily Married (1946, Short) – Mrs. Bates
 Three Little Pirates (1946, Short) – Rita Yolanda
 Bride and Gloom (1947, Short) – Maisie Keeler
 Two Jills and a Jack (1947, Short) – Betty
 Out West (1947, Short) – Nell
 Brideless Groom (1947, Short) – Miss Lulu Hopkins
 Wife to Spare (1947, Short) – Honey Jackson
 Wedlock Deadlock (1947, Short) – Betty
 All Gummed Up (1947, Short) – Mrs. Serena Flint
 Shivering Sherlocks (1948, Short) – Gladys Harmon
 Squareheads of the Round Table (1948, Short) – Princess Elaine
 Jitter Bughouse (1948, Short) – Myrtle
 The Hot Scots (1948, Short) – Lorna Doone
 Crime on Their Hands (1948, Short) – Bea
 Who Done It? (1949, Short) – Goodrich's Niece
 Fuelin' Around (1949, Short) – Hazel Sneed
 Waiting in the Lurch (1949, Short) – Mae Knott
 Vagabond Loafers (1949, Short) – Mrs. Ethel Allen
 Punchy Cowpunchers (1950, Short) – Nell
 Hugs and Mugs (1950, Short) – Lily
 Dopey Dicks (1950, Short) – Louise
 Love at First Bite (1950, Short) – Katrina
 Three Hams on Rye (1950, Short) – Janiebelle
 Studio Stoops (1950, Short) – Dolly Devore
 Bubble Trouble (1953, Short) – (archive footage)
 Pals and Gals (1954, Short) – Nell
 Knutzy Knights (1954, Short) – Princess Elaine
 Scotched in Scotland (1954, Short) – Lorna Doone
 Of Cash and Hash (1955, Short) – Gladys Harmon (final film role)
 Hot Ice (1955, Short) – Bea (archive footage)
 Husbands Beware (1956, Short) – Lulu Hopkins (archive footage)
 For Crimin' Out Loud (1956, Short) – Delores – Goodrich's Niece (archive footage)
 Hot Stuff (1956, Short) – Hazel Sneed (archive footage)
 Scheming Schemers (1956, Short) – Mrs. Allen (archive footage)
 Fifi Blows Her Top (1958, Short) – Katrina (archive footage)
 Stop! Look! and Laugh! (1960, Short) – Alice Andrews (Van Doren) (uncredited) (archive footage)

Other films

 Sea Racketeers (1937) – Mrs. Wilbur Crane
 The Rangers' Round-Up (1938) – Mary
 Missing Daughters (1939) – Ruth (uncredited)
 Blondie Takes a Vacation (1939) – Resort Singer (of 'Love in Bloom') (uncredited)
 The Gunman from Bodie (1941) – Alice Borden
 Forbidden Trails (1941) – Mary Doran
 Man from Headquarters (1942) – Telegraph Girl
 The Power of God (1942) – Charlotte Hale
 Rock River Renegades (1942) – Grace Ross
 Riders of the West (1942) – Hope Turner
 Dawn on the Great Divide (1942) – Mary Harkins
 Cinderella Swings It (1943) – Secretary
 Border Buckaroos (1943) – Betty Clark
 The Stranger from Pecos (1943) – Ruth Martin
 Beautiful But Broke (1944) – Telephone Operator (uncredited)
 Partners of the Trail (1944) – Kate Hilton
 Louisiana Hayride (1944) – Christine – Female Star (uncredited)
 West of the Rio Grande (1944) – Alice Darcy
 Kansas City Kitty (1944) – Hat Check Girl (uncredited)
 Men in Her Diary (1945) – Ms. Simmons (uncredited)
 The Crimson Canary (1945) – Anita's Roommate (uncredited)
 Frontier Feud (1945) – Blanche Corey
 Behind the Mask (1946) – Minor Role (uncredited)
 The Gentleman from Texas (1946) – Flo Vickert
 Valley of Fear (1947) – Joan Travers
 Land of the Lawless (1947) – Kansas City Kate
 The Secret Life of Walter Mitty (1947) – Miss Blair – Lingerie Dept. Manager (uncredited)
 News Hounds (1947) – Jane P. Connelly
 Gun Talk (1947) – Daisy Cameron
 A Modern Marriage (1950) – Nurse
 Corky of Gasoline Alley (1951) – Myrtle
 Colorado Ambush (1951) – Mae Star
 Wanted: Dead or Alive (1951) – Spangles Calhoun

References

External links

 
 Christine McIntyre at threestooges.net
  Christine McIntyre with writer Bill Capello in 1976.

American film actresses
American operatic sopranos
1911 births
1984 deaths
Actresses from Arizona
Burials at Holy Cross Cemetery, Culver City
Columbia Pictures contract players
Deaths from cancer in California
People from Nogales, Arizona
People from Van Nuys, Los Angeles
20th-century American actresses
20th-century American women opera singers
20th-century American comedians